The voiced labial–velar plosive is a type of consonantal sound, used in some spoken languages. To make this sound, one can say go but with the lips closed as if one were saying Bo; the lips are to be released at the same time as or a fraction of a second after the g of go is pronounced. Its voiceless counterpart is voiceless labial–velar plosive, .

The voiced labial–velar plosive is commonly found in Niger-Congo languages, e.g. in   Igbo (Volta-Congo, in the name  [iɡ͡boː] itself) or in  Bété (Atlantic-Congo), e.g. in the surname of Laurent Gbagbo ([ɡ͡baɡ͡bo]), former president of Ivory Coast.

Features
Features of the voiced labial–velar stop:

Occurrence

See also
 List of phonetics topics

Notes

References

External links
 

Labial–velar consonants
Central consonants
Voiced oral consonants
Plosives
Pulmonic consonants